On April 22, 2011, a violent EF4 tornado, with winds of , struck the St. Louis metropolitan area. The tornado, which was the strongest to hit St. Louis County or City since January 1967, moved through many suburbs and neighborhoods, damaging and destroying many homes and businesses. The worst damage was in the Bridgeton area, where a few homes were completely leveled. In its  track across the St. Louis metropolitan area, the tornado damaged thousands of homes, left thousands without power, and caused heavy damage to St. Louis Lambert International Airport, closing it for nearly 24 hours. The tornado crossed into Illinois and tore the roofs off homes in Granite City before dissipating. The tornado was part of a period of high tornado activity that preceded the 2011 Super Outbreak.

Tornado summary

The tornado initially touched down near Creve Coeur Lake at 7:59 p.m. CDT (00:59 UTC) and moved into Maryland Heights where it produced EF3 damage. The tornado continued eastward and reached EF4 intensity in Bridgeton where a number of houses were completely destroyed. Afterwards the tornado traveled parallel to I-70 and struck Lambert–St. Louis International Airport, blowing out numerous windows and peeling away a large section of roof. The tornado then moved into the Berkeley neighborhood where it continued to produce EF2 damage, tearing the roofs from several homes. The tornado continued on through several more neighborhoods, causing roof damage to a church and two businesses in Ferguson, one of which completely experienced total roof loss. The storm also produced extensive tree damage and some roof damage to homes as well as partially removing the roof of an elementary school. Damage along this entire section of the storm's path was rated EF1 to low-end EF2. The tornado continued toward the Mississippi River resulting in mostly EF1 damage to trees, however EF2 damage occurred in Dellwood where extensive tree and utility pole damage occurred and three homes lost their roofs. EF2 damage continued as the tornado crossed into Illinois where about a hundred homes were damaged, three of which lost their roofs, and numerous trees were uprooted and snapped.

The tornado hit Lambert–St. Louis International Airport, Missouri's largest, about 8:10 p.m. CDT (01:10 UTC). Three aircraft were on the tarmac with passengers aboard. Numerous passengers and other people were in the airport's terminals.

Concourse C had a large section of its roof torn off when the tornado struck. Many windows at the airport were blown out, and signs were damaged as well. Vehicles outside were tossed by the tornado, including a van which was partially pushed over the edge of a parking garage. Lambert Airport released surveillance video showing debris swirling inside the airport as people ran for cover. It was reported that an aircraft was moved away from its jetway by the storm, with passengers still on board. One plane from Southwest Airlines was damaged when the wind pushed a conveyor belt used for loading baggage into it. American Airlines said that four of its planes were damaged, two of them significantly. One was buffeted by  crosswinds while taxiing in from a landing when the tornado hit and the other had possible damage to its landing gear. The tornado was rated an EF2 storm when it struck the airport.

The airport was closed by the FAA at 8:54 p.m. CDT (01:54 UTC), and reopened at temporarily reduced capacity on April 23. It was expected to be at 70% capacity on April 24.

Other effects

More than 54,000 Ameren customers were left without power after the storm: more than 47,000 in Missouri and about 7,000 in Illinois.

By 5:40 a.m. CDT on April 24, 21,667 customers in Missouri and 131 in Illinois were still without power.

On April 24, the St. Louis Post-Dispatch reported more than 2,700 buildings were severely damaged in St. Louis County, including 900 in Bridgeton, 450 in Berkeley and 1,170 in Maryland Heights.

Another tornado also hit New Melle in St. Charles County, about 30 miles west of the airport.

No deaths resulted from the tornado, and only five people were injured.

See also 
Tornado outbreak sequence of April 19–24, 2011
Tornadoes of 2011
List of North American tornadoes and tornado outbreaks
St. Louis tornado history
Tornado intensity and damage

References

External links 

 NOAA information, with map of the tornado's track across St. Louis
 Security video of the airport's light rail platform during the storm
 Security video of the airport's heavily damaged C Concourse during the storm
 Eyewitness video shot inside the airport during the storm
 Local newspaper's video of damage inside the C Concourse, shot the following day
 Despite warning, St. Louis tornado caught airport, passengers off guard
 In St. Louis, pilot was unaware of approaching tornado
 
 Looking back: the Good Friday tornado of 2011

F4 tornadoes by date
Tornadoes in Missouri
Tornadoes in Illinois
St. Louis,2011-04-22
04-22
Tornado,2011-04-22,St. Louis
St. Louis tornado